Tilius is a genus of beetles in the family Carabidae, containing the following species:

 Tilius holosericeus (Chaudoir, 1850)
 Tilius lacunosus Basilewsky, 1948
 Tilius obscurellus (Dejean, 1831)
 Tilius quadriimpressus (Fairmaire, 1898)
 Tilius subsericeus Chaudoir, 1876
 Tilius sulcatus Alluaud, 1932

References

Lebiinae